Carina Bär (also spelled Baer; born 23 January 1990 in Heilbronn) is a German rower. At the 2016 Summer Olympics in Rio de Janeiro she competed in the women's quadruple sculls competition in which the German team (Bär, Annekatrin Thiele, Julia Lier and Lisa Schmidla) won the gold medal.  She had previous won the silver medal in the same event at the 2012 Summer Olympics.

At the World level, Bär won the 2013 title with Thiele, Julia Richter and Britta Oppelt.  Bär, Thiele, Schmidla and Lier won the 2014 World Championships in a world's best time (which remains the world's best time in January 2019).  The team of Bär, Thiele, Schmidla and Marie-Catherine Arnold won the silver medal at the 2015 World Championship in the women's quadruple sculls.  Bär also has a World bronze medal from 2010 (with Oppelt, Richter and Tina Manker).

At the European level, the team of Bär, Thiele, Schmidla and Arnold won the 2015 and 2016 European Championship in the women's quadruple sculls, the latter on home water in Brandenburg.  Bär had previous won the European title with Thiele, Richter and Oppelt in 2013.  In 2010 she was part of the German women's quadruple sculls team that finished second.

At Junior level, Bär won a silver in the single sculls at the 2011 World Under 23 Championships, having won a bronze in 2009.  She also won the women's Junior Single Sculls World title in 2008.

References

External links
 
 
 
 

1990 births
Living people
Sportspeople from Heilbronn
Rowers at the 2012 Summer Olympics
Rowers at the 2016 Summer Olympics
Olympic rowers of Germany
Olympic gold medalists for Germany
Olympic silver medalists for Germany
Olympic medalists in rowing
Medalists at the 2012 Summer Olympics
Medalists at the 2016 Summer Olympics
German female rowers
World Rowing Championships medalists for Germany
European Rowing Championships medalists
21st-century German women
20th-century German women